Courtney James Hawkins (born November 12, 1993) is an American professional baseball outfielder for the Fukuoka SoftBank Hawks of Nippon Professional Baseball (NPB).

Early career
Hawkins attended Mary Carroll High School in Corpus Christi, Texas. As a senior, he was the Texas Gatorade High School Baseball Player of the Year. He was the fifth ranked high school recruit in his class by ESPN and was committed to University of Texas at Austin.

Professional career

Chicago White Sox (2012–2018)
The Chicago White Sox selected Hawkins in the first round, with the 13th overall selection, of the 2012 Major League Baseball draft. Hawkins started his career with the rookie-level Bristol White Sox of the Appalachian League. In 38 games he hit .272/.314/.401 with three home runs and 16 runs batted in. On August 12, 2012, he was promoted to the Low-A Kannapolis Intimidators of the South Atlantic League. He hit .308/.352/.631 with four home runs and 15 runs batted in 16 games. He ended the season with the High-A Winston-Salem Dash after he was promoted on August 29, 2012. Overall, he finished his first season hitting .284/.324/.480 with eight home runs and 33 runs batted in 59 games. Hawkins was ranked the White Sox #1 prospect at the start of the 2013 season. He was also ranked as the #55 ranked prospect in baseball according to Baseball America and #68 by MLB.com. Hawkins spent the whole 2013 season with Class A-Advanced Winston-Salem Dash. He struggled in his first full season, batting .178 with 19 home runs and 160 strikeouts in 383 at-bats.

Hawkins returned to Winston-Salem in 2014, batting .249 with 19 home runs and 84 RBIs. He spent 2015 with the Birmingham Barons, batting .243 with nine home runs and 41 RBIs, and 2016 with Birmingham, posting a .203 average with 12 home runs and 60 RBIs. In 2017, he played for Kannapolis, Winston-Salem and Birmingham, posting a combined .205 average with 12 home runs and 33 RBIs in 91 total games between both teams. Hawkins was released from the organization on April 18, 2018.

Journeyman (2018–2022)

On April 26, 2018, Hawkins signed with the Sugar Land Skeeters of the Atlantic League of Professional Baseball. Hawkins appeared in 88 games for the Skeeters and hit .285/.342/.505 with 54 runs, 17 doubles, 18 home runs, 72 RBIs, and 12 stolen bases.

On August 10, 2018, Hawkins' contract was purchased by the Cincinnati Reds. He was released by the Reds organization on May 3, 2019. On May 10, 2019, Hawkins signed with the Skeeters.

On May 14, 2019, Hawkins's contract was purchased by the San Francisco Giants and he was assigned to the Triple-A Sacramento River Cats. He became a free agent following the 2019 season. In July 2020, Hawkins signed on to play for the Skeeters of the Constellation Energy League, a makeshift four-team independent league created as a result of the COVID-19 pandemic, for the 2020 season. He was named to the league's all-star team.

On May 4, 2021, Hawkins signed with the Lexington Legends of the Atlantic League of Professional Baseball. In Game 4 of the Atlantic League's championship series, Hawkins hit three home runs in the Legends 13–2 victory, clinching the franchise's first league championship. Hawkins was named the most valuable player of the series.

Fukuoka SoftBank Hawks
On December 21, 2022, Hawkins signed with the Fukuoka SoftBank Hawks of Nippon Professional Baseball.

References

External links

1993 births
Living people
Bristol White Sox players
Kannapolis Intimidators players
Winston-Salem Dash players
Birmingham Barons players
Sugar Land Skeeters players
Daytona Tortugas players
Lexington Legends players
Sportspeople from Corpus Christi, Texas
Baseball players from Texas
Chattanooga Lookouts players
Glendale Desert Dogs players
Louisville Bats players
San Jose Giants players
Sultanes de Monterrey players
African-American baseball players
American expatriate baseball players in Mexico